Second Congregational Church may refer to:

Second Congregational Church (Newcastle, Maine), listed on the U.S. National Register of Historic Places (NRHP)
Second Congregational Church of Attleboro (Massachusetts), Attleboro, Massachusetts, U.S.
Second Congregational Church of Newport or Clarke Street Meeting House, Rhode Island, U.S., NRHP-listed
Second Congregational Church (Memphis, Tennessee), U.S., NRHP-listed